Santa Fe is a Spanish municipality in the province of Granada, situated in the Vega de Granada, irrigated by the river Genil. The town was originally built by the Catholic armies besieging Granada (c. 1490) after a fire destroyed much of their encampment. The Capitulations of Santa Fe between Columbus and the Catholic Monarchs were signed there shortly after the fall of Granada (2 January 1492) on 17 April 1492, and the city therefore advertises itself as "the cradle of hispanicity".

The municipality is jointly-eponymous with Santa Fe, New Mexico in the United States. Both cities feature a castle, lion, and the Spanish imperial eagle on their official seals and flags.

International relations

Twin towns – sister cities
Santa Fe is twinned with:
 Vire-Normandie, France
 Santa Fe, New Mexico, United States

References

Municipalities in the Province of Granada